The Markus Liebherr Memorial Cup was an invitational football friendly tournament held at St Mary's, Southampton. The competition was named after former Southampton Chairman Markus Liebherr. Described as a "unique triangular cup competition", each club played one another and points determined the winners of the tournament, which was held in 2011 and 2012, and won by Athletic Bilbao and Arsenal.

2011 
Source:

The inaugural edition of the Markus Liebherr Memorial Cup was held on 23 July 2011 as a triangular round-robin system. Various European teams were invited to compete in a tournament, with the other participants besides the hosts Southampton being the Spanish club Athletic Bilbao and German club Werder Bremen. The hosts won the first match of the tournament, beating Bremen 3–0 with goals from David Connolly, Guly do Prado and Adam Lallana. Bilbao also beat Bremen, with a 2–1 scoreline, thanks to goals from Igor Gabilondo and Gaizka Toquero. In the decisive match between Southampton and Bilbao, it was the Spanish side who won 2–0, with Igor Martínez and Markel Susaeta sealing the title to Bilbao.

Each match lasted 45 minutes each. Drawn matches were resolved by extra-time and then penalities.

Final Standings

2012 
Source:

Scottish club Rangers were initially scheduled to take part, but were later replaced by Anderlecht due to the financial troubles that Rangers were facing. The tournament was held on 14 July as a triangular round-robin system in 45-minute matches, and in the first match of the tournament, Southampton lost to Anderlecht 1–0, with the only goal coming early in the first half from Tom De Sutter. Arsenal then won their first game against Anderlecht by the same scoreline, with a goal from young midfielder Henri Lansbury deciding the match. In the decisive match between Southampton and Arsenal, the Saints new signing Jay Rodriguez netted on his debut for the club in the 31st minute, although the lead proved short-lived when Gervinho equalized a few minutes later, causing the game to end in a tie, and despite Arsenal losing 5–4 on penalties, it was them who won the second Memorial Cup and joined Athletic Bilbao on the honours list.

Each match lasted 45 minutes each. Drawn matches were resolved by extra-time and then penalities.

Final Standings

References

External links 

English football friendly trophies
Defunct football cup competitions in England
Sport in Southampton
Football in Hampshire

2011–12 in English football
2011–12 in German football
2011–12 in Spanish football
2012–13 in English football
2012–13 in Belgian football

Recurring sporting events established in 2011
Recurring sporting events disestablished in 2012
2011 establishments in England
2012 disestablishments in England

Southampton F.C.